Katrin Mattscherodt (born 26 October 1981) is a German long track speed skater who participates in international competitions.  In the team pursuit final against Japan at the 2010 Vancouver Winter Olympics, she was a replacement for Anni Friesinger-Postma in the final (after Friesinger-Postma had problems finishing in the semifinal), and won a gold medal as part of the German team.

Personal records

Career highlights

European Allround Championships
2006 - Hamar, 17th
2007 - Collalbo, 14th
2008 - Kolomna,  9th
National Championships
2005 - Berlin,  3rd at 3000 m
2005 - Berlin,  2nd at 5000 m
2006 - Berlin,  2nd at 5000 m
2006 - Erfurt,  3rd at allround
2007 - Erfurt,  2nd at 3000 m
2007 - Erfurt,  3rd at 1500 m
2007 - Erfurt,  2nd at 5000 m
2008 - Inzell,  3rd at 500 m allround
2008 - Inzell,  1st at 1500 m allround
2008 - Inzell,  3rd at 1000 m allround
2008 - Inzell,  1st at 3000 m allround
Nordic Neo-Senior Games
2003 - Warszawa,  2nd at 3000 m
2003 - Warszawa,  2nd at 1500 m
2003 - Warszawa,  1st at 5000 m
European Youth-23 Games
2004 - Göteborg,  3rd at 3000 m
2004 - Göteborg,  3rd at 1500 m
2004 - Göteborg,  2nd at 5000 m
2005 - Helsinki,  2nd at 3000 m
2005 - Helsinki,  2nd at 1500 m
2005 - Helsinki,  1st at 5000 m

External links
Mattscherodt at Jakub Majerski's Speedskating Database
Mattscherodt at SkateResults.com

1981 births
German female speed skaters
Speed skaters at the 2010 Winter Olympics
Olympic speed skaters of Germany
Medalists at the 2010 Winter Olympics
Olympic medalists in speed skating
Olympic gold medalists for Germany
Speed skaters from Berlin
Living people
21st-century German women